The 1997–98 Edmonton Oilers season was the Oilers' 19th season in the NHL, and they were coming off a 36–37–9 record in 1996–97, earning their first Stanley Cup playoff spot in five seasons. The Oilers then defeated the heavily favoured Colorado Avalanche before losing to the Dallas Stars in the second round.

Edmonton began the season slowly, and on January 4, with a record of 11–22–9, the Oilers traded Jason Arnott and Bryan Muir to the New Jersey Devils in exchange for Bill Guerin and Valeri Zelepukin. The trade seemed to spark Edmonton, as they finished the year 24–15–1, making the playoffs for the second-straight season after finishing in seventh place in the Western Conference.

Offensively, Doug Weight had another solid season, leading the Oilers in goals (26), assists (44) and points (70). Ryan Smyth was the only other player to score at least 20 goals for the team. Dean McAmmond had a breakout season, finishing second to Weight with 50 points, as well as third in goals, with 19. Bill Guerin had a solid half season in Edmonton, scoring 13 goals and 29 points in 40 games. Boris Mironov would lead the defence with 16 goals and 46 points, while Drake Berehowsky would lead the team with 169 penalty minutes.

In goal, Curtis Joseph got the majority of playing time, winning 29 games, posting a goals against average (GAA) of 2.63 and setting the club record with shutouts in a season at eight. Bob Essensa backed him up once again, contributing a solid GAA of 2.55 and winning six games. The Oilers also tied the Dallas Stars for most power-play goals scored (77) and finished with the most power-play opportunities (483) in the League.

On March 2, 1998, Scott Fraser scored just 11 seconds into the overtime period to give the Oilers a 5-4 road win over the Colorado Avalanche. It would prove to be the fastest overtime goal scored during the 1997–98 regular season.

The Oilers opened the playoffs against the Pacific Division-winning Colorado Avalanche, who eliminated Edmonton from the playoffs the previous spring, and finished with 15 more points during the regular season. The Oilers, however, surprised the Avalanche in the opening game, winning 3–2, but Colorado stormed back to win three in a row to go up 3–1 in the series. The Oilers held off the Avalanche in Game 5 with a 3–1 in Denver, then returned home for game 6 to shut-out Colorado 2–0, forcing a deciding Game 7. Curtis Joseph earned his second-straight shutout in the series, as Edmonton won 4–0 and the series 4–3, eliminating the heavily favoured Avalanche.

In the second round, Edmonton played against Dallas, whom the Oilers defeated the previous year in the opening round. The Stars finished with an NHL-best 109 points in the regular season. The Stars beat Edmonton in the first game, but Curtis Joseph shut-out Dallas in Game 2, evening the series as it returned to Edmonton for the next two games. The third game was scoreless in regulation time, though the Stars scored in the first overtime period to take a 2–1 series lead. The Oilers' offence then went dry as they scored only two goals in the next two games, losing both, and the series 4–1.

Season standings

Schedule and results

Playoffs

Season stats

Scoring leaders

Goaltending

Playoff stats

Scoring leaders

Goaltending

Awards and records

Awards

Records
 14: An Oilers record for most shutouts in a career by Curtis Joseph.
10: A new Oilers record for most shutouts in a career by Curtis Joseph on February 2, 1998.

Milestones

Transactions

Trades

Free agents

Draft picks
Edmonton's draft picks at the 1997 NHL Entry Draft

References
 SHRP Sports
 The Internet Hockey Database
 National Hockey League Guide & Record Book 2007

Edmonton Oilers seasons, 1997-98
Edmon
Edmonton Oilers seasons